Henry Wilkins may refer to:

Henry St Clair Wilkins (1828–1896), British Army general, engineer and architect in India
Hank Wilkins (born 1954), American politician, member of the Arkansas General Assembly
Henry Wilkins (basketball) (born 1990), British basketball player

See also
Henry Wilkens (1855–1895), German-born American soldier and Medal of Honor recipient in the Nez Perce War